The Hunt–Lauda rivalry was an individual sport rivalry that ran from 1973 to 1979 between two Formula One drivers: the British James Hunt and the Austrian Niki Lauda. 

While they competed on the track, Hunt readily admitted that the two were good friends from their early days "gypsi(ng) around Europe together" in Formula Three, where they became "mates, not just casual acquaintances." The enduring friendship between the two continued until Hunt's death in 1993.

The Ron Howard film Rush was based on this rivalry, including their admiration for each other, though replacing their real-world friendship with a more intense (sometimes even nasty) rivalry, before ending with a warm moment and Lauda's voiceover that Hunt was "among the very few I liked, and even fewer I respected."

Formula One World Championship

Head-to-head results

See also
 1976 Formula One season
 List of sports rivalries

References

External links
  Le grandi rivalità della storia della Formula 1: Lauda contro Hunt

Formula One rivalries
Niki Lauda